HMS Bristol (D23) was a Type 82 destroyer, the only vessel of her class to be built for the Royal Navy. Bristol was intended to be the first of a class of large destroyers to escort the CVA-01 aircraft carriers projected to come into service in the early 1970s but the rest of the class and the CVA-01 carriers were cancelled as a result of the 1966 Defence White Paper which cut defence spending.

Following a long career which included the Falklands War, she was converted into a training ship in 1987. In 1991 while part of the Dartmouth training squadron, she suffered a failure of one of her Olympus gas turbines that damaged the vessel beyond economical repair. No longer having enough value to be sold to another navy, she became a Harbour Training ship at HMS Excellent.  She was decommissioned in Portsmouth on 28 October 2020.

Origin

The CVA-01 fleet aircraft carrier was designed to replace the World War II vintage aircraft carriers of the Royal Navy. The first plans were for two carriers and to protect these carriers four new Type 82 area air defence destroyers were to be built. In 1963, the Minister of Defence Peter Thorneycroft, announced in Parliament that one new aircraft carrier would be built, at an estimated cost of £56 million. However, a change of government and competition from the RAF (the RAF and Navy were both expected to use the Hawker P.1154 supersonic V/STOL aircraft, a larger version of the Hawker Siddeley Harrier) saw the project being cancelled in the 1966 Defence White Paper. This eliminated the requirement for the Type 82 class destroyer. However, one vessel of the original four was ordered on 4 October 1966 for use as a testbed for new technologies. HMS Bristol was launched in 1969, with four new weapons and electronics systems.

Construction 
Bristol hull was laid down by Swan Hunter & Tyne Shipbuilders Ltd on 15 November 1967. She was launched on 30 June 1969, accepted into service on 15 December 1972 and then commissioned on 31 March 1973. Her estimated building cost was £24,217,000.

Weapon systems
Bristol saw a number of new systems introduced into the Navy, including the Sea Dart anti-aircraft and Ikara anti-submarine missile systems and was the first Royal Navy ship to carry the 4.5 inch (114 mm) Mk 8 gun. Another addition to the fleet was the new advanced Action Data Automated Weapons System Mk.2 (ADAWS-2), a computer system designed to coordinate the ship's weapons and sensors. ADAWS-2 was a large advance on the rudimentary action information system of its predecessor the s, which was heavily reliant on manual data input.

The Sea Dart (GWS 30) system comprised a twin-arm launcher on the quarterdeck with a pair of radar Type 909 target illumination sets, an improvement over the single radar Type 901 set of the County design. The second weapon system was the Australian Ikara anti-submarine weapon. The Ikara was complemented by a Mark 10 Limbo anti-submarine mortar.

The single 4.5 inch (113 mm) Mark 8 gun was not intended as an anti-aircraft weapon, and as such had an elevation of only 55°. The weapon was designed specifically for reliability over rate of fire, allowing only a single mounting to be shipped, and the comparatively low rate of fire of 25 rounds per minute was ample for the intended anti-ship and shore-bombardment roles. Bristol, although capable of landing a Westland Wasp helicopter on the quarterdeck, lacked a hangar and aviation facilities and thus had to rely on external air support.

Active service

The role which Bristol was built for never materialised, and she consequently spent most of her service in the 1970s trialling and building up experience using new weapons and computer systems. A major boiler fire in 1974 destroyed the steam plant however Bristol was able to operate for a further three years using only her gas plant, demonstrating its flexibility and utility. The steam plant was repaired in 1976. In 1979 she was fitted out for frontline service with ECM, Corvus countermeasures launchers and a pair of World War II-era Oerlikon 20 mm cannon. During this refit the Limbo weapon was removed; its well was later used as a makeshift swimming pool.

Falklands War (1982)

Bristol was suitable for use as a flagship as she was large enough to embark the extra staff members necessary for this role. She served as the Royal Navy flagship during the 1981 Ocean Safari exercise. After a short refit, during which the mortar well was plated over to allow the landing of large helicopters on the quarterdeck, she joined the Royal Navy task force in the South Atlantic in the 1982 Falklands War. Bristol led the Bristol group of reinforcement ships south and then joined the carrier battle group, Task Group 317.8. On 22 May she fired two Sea Dart missiles at spurious radar returns caused by interference with similar radars fitted on ships within the group. When the aircraft carrier , the flagship, returned to the UK, Bristol took over as flagship until 17 September with Vice Admiral Derek Reffell aboard as senior-officer-in-theatre, returning to the UK after being relieved by the carrier .

On return to the UK she entered a refit and, in light of the lessons of the conflict, had her light anti aircraft weapons augmented with a pair of twin Oerlikon/BMARC 30 mm GCM-A03 and a pair of single Oerlikon/BMARC 20 mm GAM-B01 guns. Loral-Hycor SRBOC countermeasures launchers were also added to augment the elderly Corvus launchers.

Post-Falklands service
With the Royal Navy short on hulls after damage and losses incurred in the Falklands, Bristol remained in commission and made several overseas deployments until paid off for refit in 1984. Another boiler explosion when entering refit caused extensive damage that had to be repaired. The major work undertaken in the refit was to replace the obsolete radar Type 965 with the new Type 1022 for long-range air search duties. The Ikara system was removed; it was intended to replace it with two triple STWS-1 launchers for 324 mm anti-submarine torpedoes, but they were never fitted.

Training ship

By the late 1980s the ship was becoming increasingly outdated. As the fleet downsized, maintaining a unique vessel when plenty of other air defence destroyers were in commission no longer seemed worthwhile. HMS Bristol was paid off in 1991 and refitted to replace HMS Kent, as the harbour training ship located at the shore establishment . Bristol was berthed at Whale Island, Portsmouth and was primarily used as a training ship and accommodation ship for Royal Naval personnel and youth organisations. Many young people from the Sea Cadets, the Combined Cadet Force and the Sea Scouts had their first experience of life on board a warship on Bristol. Air Training Corps and Army Cadet Force units also made use of the facilities. The ship had also been used by a number of colleges running the Edexcel BTEC Public Services course. The ship's company was made up of a mix of Royal Navy and civilian staff.  She was also used by the RNVCC cadets during their first wave exercise when the recruits ended their training to become Cadets.

Bristol was refitted at A&P Tyne, Hebburn. The effects of the refit were said to "... extend the service life of HMS Bristol for 10 years". Work was intended to bring facilities on Bristol in line with health and safety standards. The redundant masts containing the ship's Type 1022 and Type 992Q search radars were removed. She departed from Portsmouth on 20 October 2010, and arrived at Hebburn under tow on the morning of 3 November 2010. HMS Bristol left Hebburn in April 2011 to return to Portsmouth.

Bristol's role as a training ship ceased on 28 October 2020, with the Ministry of Defence announcing that she would be disposed of. When news of the disposal was made public the leader of Portsmouth City Council Gerald Vernon-Jackson called for Bristol to be maintained as a museum ship within the National Museum of the Royal Navy.
HMS Bristol was transferred to the Disposal reserve ships organisation on 1 December 2020.

Campaign to save HMS Bristol 
The HMS Bristol Preservation Society is campaigning to save the Bristol as a museum ship. A petition has been published on the United Kingdom Parliament website. A petition that was created in 2020 on Change.org has garnered over 11,000 signatories.

Notes

References

External links

https://bristolpreservatio.wixsite.com/hms-bristol-preserva. HMS Bristol Preservation Society.

 

Type 82 destroyers
Ships built by Swan Hunter
Ships built on the River Tyne
1969 ships
Cold War destroyers of the United Kingdom
Falklands War naval ships of the United Kingdom